Humleby (lit. "Hops Town") is an enclave of terraced houses situated next to the Carlsberg area in the Vesterbro district of Copenhagen, Denmark. They were built between 1885 and 1891 by the Worker's Building Society to provide healthy housing for the workers at Burmeister & Wain.

The area consists of 235 three storey houses. They were designed by Frederik Bøttger, the architect of the Building Society, who was inspired by English working-class housing.

Streets
 Vesterfælledvej
 Ny Carlsberg Vej* Freundsgade - named after the sculptor Hermann Ernst Freund (1786-1840)
 Jerichausgade - named after the sculptor Jens Adolf Jerichau (1816-1883) 
 Bissensgade - named after Herman Wilhelm Bissen (1798-1868)
 Ernst Meyers Gade - named after the painter Ernst Meyer (1797-1861)
 Lundbyesgade - named after the painter Johan Thomas Lundbye (1818-1848)
 Küchlersgade - named after the painter Albert Küchler (1803-1886) 
 Carstensgade - named after the painter Asmus Jacob Carstens (1754-1798)

See also
 Kildevækd Quarter

References

External links

 Architecturaol renderings in the Danish National Art Library

Residential buildings in Copenhagen
Vesterbro, Copenhagen